Phrixosceles is a genus of moths in the family Gracillariidae.

Species
Phrixosceles campsigrapha Meyrick, 1908 
Phrixosceles fibulatrix Meyrick, 1922  
Phrixosceles hydrocosma Meyrick, 1908 
Phrixosceles literaria Meyrick, 1908 
Phrixosceles phricotarsa Meyrick, 1916  
Phrixosceles pteridograpta Meyrick, 1935 
Phrixosceles scioplintha Meyrick, 1934  
Phrixosceles trochosticha Meyrick, 1908

External links
Global Taxonomic Database of Gracillariidae (Lepidoptera)

Gracillariinae
Gracillarioidea genera